Təzəkənd (also, Tazakend) is a village and municipality in the Dashkasan Rayon of Azerbaijan.  It has a population of 560.

References 

Populated places in Dashkasan District